The 1975 Coppa Italia Final was the final of the 1974–75 Coppa Italia. The match was played on 28 June 1975 between Fiorentina and Milan. Fiorentina won 3–2. It was Fiorentina's sixth final and fourth victory.

Match

References 
Coppa Italia 1974/75 statistics at rsssf.com
 https://www.calcio.com/calendario/ita-coppa-italia-1974-1975-finale/2/
 https://www.worldfootball.net/schedule/ita-coppa-italia-1974-1975-finale/2/

Coppa Italia Finals
Coppa Italia Final 1975
Coppa Italia Final 1975